Christiaan Jonker (born 24 September 1986) is a South African cricketer who represents the South Africa national cricket team. He was included in the Border cricket team for the 2015 Africa T20 Cup.

Domestic and T20 franchise career
In August 2017, he was named in Jo'burg Giants' squad for the first season of the T20 Global League. However, in October 2017, Cricket South Africa initially postponed the tournament until November 2018, with it being cancelled soon after.

On 3 June 2018, he was selected to play for the Edmonton Royals in the players' draft for the inaugural edition of the Global T20 Canada tournament.

In August 2018, he was named in Border's squad for the 2018 Africa T20 Cup. In October 2018, he was named in Nelson Mandela Bay Giants' squad for the first edition of the Mzansi Super League T20 tournament. Later the same month, he was named in the squad for the Rajshahi Kings team, following the draft for the 2018–19 Bangladesh Premier League. In April 2021, he was named in Boland's squad, ahead of the 2021–22 cricket season in South Africa.

International career
In February 2018, he was named in South Africa's Twenty20 International (T20I) squad for their series against India. He made his T20I debut for South Africa against India on 24 February 2018. In September 2018, he was named in South Africa's One Day International (ODI) series against Zimbabwe. He made his ODI debut for South Africa against Zimbabwe on 30 September 2018.

References

External links
 

1986 births
Living people
South African cricketers
South Africa One Day International cricketers
Warriors cricketers
South Africa Twenty20 International cricketers
Border cricketers
Nelson Mandela Bay Giants cricketers
People from Rustenburg
Rajshahi Royals cricketers
Durban's Super Giants cricketers